Reginald Ernest Walker (born December 15, 1986) is an American football linebacker who is currently a free agent. He played college football at Kansas State.

Early life
Although he was born in Fairbanks, Alaska, Walker grew up in Missouri and Sacramento, California. During his three years as a starter at Grant Union High School in Sacramento, he was one of the top LBs in the state of California. He was a Metro Conference selection and the league’s defensive MVP. He also was an all-conference selection in rugby and was involved in the math honors club .

College career
Walker finished college career by starting 22 of 46 games played and registered 163 tackles, 15.5 tackles for loss, five sacks, six passes defensed, three forced fumbles and one fumble recovery.

Professional career

Arizona Cardinals
He was signed by the Cardinals as an undrafted free agent in 2009.  He was released from the Cardinals during the 2013-2014 pre-season.

San Diego Chargers
On September 1, 2013, he agreed to terms with the San Diego Chargers, reuniting with his former special teams coach Kevin Spencer and head coach Ken Whisenhunt. In his first year with the Chargers, Walker played all 16 games, starting 6 of them, while collecting 36 tackles, 3 sacks, 1 pass defended, and a forced fumble

Denver Broncos
Walker signed with the Denver Broncos on March 19, 2015.  Walker was released by the Broncos following the 2015 preseason on August 31, 2015.

References

External links
Arizona Cardinals bio
Kansas State Wildcats bio

1986 births
Living people
Sportspeople from Fairbanks, Alaska
Players of American football from Alaska
African-American players of American football
American football linebackers
Kansas State Wildcats football players
Arizona Cardinals players
San Diego Chargers players
Denver Broncos players
21st-century African-American sportspeople
20th-century African-American people